#1 Hits Explosion is a greatest hits compilation album by The Apples in Stereo. It was released on September 1, 2009 by Yep Roc Records. The album culls songs from various LPs and EPs released by the band between 1995 and 2007.

An accompanying booklet for the album features liner notes by Jeff Kuykendall of the Elephant 6-related website Optical Atlas.

A six-song EP titled #2 Hits Explosion is available exclusively to those who order the album via the band's official website.

Track listing
All tracks composed by Robert Schneider except "Tidal Wave", composed by Schneider and Chris Parfitt; "20 Cases Suggestive of..." and "Winter Must Be Cold", composed by Hilarie Sidney; and "Can You Feel It?" composed by Schneider and Bill Doss.

#2 Hits Explosion track listing
All tracks composed by Robert Schneider except "Touch the Water", composed by Jim McIntyre; and "Yore Days", composed by Eric Allen.

References 

2009 greatest hits albums
The Apples in Stereo albums
The Elephant 6 Recording Company compilation albums
Yep Roc Records compilation albums